Thank You is the twenty-fifth studio album by American singer Diana Ross, released on November 5, 2021 by Decca Records. It marks Ross' first studio album since 2006's I Love You, and first original material since 1999's Every Day Is a New Day. The album was written during COVID-19 pandemic lockdowns in 2020 and recorded in Ross's home studio. Ross worked with songwriter and producer Jack Antonoff, as well as Jimmy Napes, Amy Wadge, Tayla Parx and Spike Stent. The title track was issued as the lead single on June 17, 2021, and is one of nine tracks on the album co-written by Ross. The album received a nomination for Best Traditional Pop Vocal Album at the 65th Grammy Awards.

Singles
Thank You debuted and peaked at No. 38 on the UK Singles Sales Chart and No. 37 on the UK Singles Downloads Chart on June 25, 2021.

"If the World Just Danced", a house-pop song, peaked at No. 57 on the UK Singles Chart and 56 on the UK Singles Downloads Chart dated October 15, 2021.

Tour
Ross toured Europe and the UK in support of the album, performed the title track during her closing act of the Queen's Jubilee concert on 4 June and embarked on the second leg of her Thank You Tour in the United States in late August 2022.

Critical reception

On review aggregator Metacritic, the album holds a score of 60 out of 100, indicating "mixed or average reviews".

Chuck Arnold of Entertainment Weekly gave the album a positive review, writing, "Thank You is a powerful showcase for how good Ross is even after a two-decade absence. It also achieves her ultimate goal: to provide a light in troubling times."

Commercial performance
Thank You performed moderately on the charts. In the United Kingdom, it debuted at No. 7 on the UK Albums Chart, becoming her first top-10 album in 26 years. In the United States, it entered  Billboard Top R&B Albums Chart at No. 25.

Track listing

Notes
  indicates a co-producer
  indicates a vocal producer

Personnel
Musicians

 Diana Ross – vocals, executive production, liner notes
 Troy Miller – bass (1, 11), drums (1, 3, 11, 13), guitar (1, 6, 11), horn (1), percussion (1, 3), piano (1, 5, 6, 11–13), synthesizer (1, 3, 11), Rhodes (3), conductor, strings (6, 9, 12); Moog bass (6), celesta (11)
 James Gardiner-Bateman – saxophones (1)
 Nichol Thompson – trombone (1, 13)
 Mike Davis – trumpet (1, 13)
 Tom Walsh – trumpet (1, 13)
 Vanessa Wood – background vocals (2, 4, 7, 10), vocal arrangement (2, 7), vocal programming (2, 4, 7)
 André Pinckney – bass (2, 4, 7, 10), acoustic guitar (4), electric guitar (4, 10), keyboards (7, 10)
 Ali Prawl – keyboards, keyboards arrangement (2, 4, 7, 10); drum programming (2, 4, 10), programming (2, 10)
 Scott M. Carter – programming, vocal programming (2, 4, 7, 10); drum programming (2, 7)
 Althea Edwards – background vocals (3, 5)
 Philly Lopez – background vocals (3, 5)
 Sharlene Hector – background vocals (3, 5)
 Teyana Miller – background vocals (3, 5, 13)
 Brian Bender – bass (3)
 John Ashton Thomas – conductor (3, 11, 13)
 Royal Philharmonic Orchestra – strings (3, 5, 11, 13)
 James Morgan – conductor (5)
 Keyon Harrold – trumpet (5)
 London Symphony Orchestra – strings (6, 9, 12)
 Fred White – background vocals (7, 11)
 Theron Feemster – keyboards (7, 13), drum programming (13)
 Autumn Rowe – background vocals (8)
 Charlie McClean – background vocals, bass, conga, percussion, piano, synthesizer (8)
 Evan Smith – background vocals, bass, electric guitar, flute, programming, saxophones, synthesizer (8)
 Ruth-Anne Cunningham – background vocals (8)
 Violet Skies – background vocals (8)
 Jack Antonoff – bass, bongos, drums, electric guitar, programming, synthesizer, tambourine (8)
 Mikey Freedom Hart – bass, electric guitar, keyboards, piano (8)
 Annie Clark – electric guitar (8)
 Cole Kamen-Green – trumpet (8)
 Bobby Hawk – trumpet (8)
 John Peters – digital piano, Moog bass, programming (9)
 Rodney Kendrick – piano (9)
 Michael Olatuja – upright bass (9)
 Bernard Lambert – drums (10)
 Chris Stevens – horn (10)
 Kyla Moscovich – horn (10)
 Aiden Miller – tambourine (12)
 Prince Charlez – background vocals (13)
 Paul Booth – baritone saxophone (13)
 Timothy Bloom – bass guitar, electric guitar (13)

Technical
 Randy Merrill – mastering
 Mark "Spike" Stent – mixing (1–4, 6–12)
 Troy Miller – mixing (5, 13)
 Danny Allin – engineering (1)
 Matt Wolach – engineering (1–4, 6–12)
 Scott M. Carter – engineering (2, 4, 7, 10), vocal engineering (2), vocal production (2, 4, 7)
 Olga FitzRoy – engineering (3, 11, 13)
 Lewis Jones – engineering (5, 6, 9, 12)
 Laura Sisk – engineering (8)
 Pete Min – engineering (11)
 Patrick Collier – engineering (13)
 Tom Walsh – engineering (13)
 Vanessa Wood – additional engineering (4), vocal production (4)
 John Rooney – engineering assistance (8)
 Jon Sher – engineering assistance (8)

Artwork
 Jeri Heiden – design
 Nadia Flower Scribbles – illustrations
 Randee St. Nicholas – photography

Charts

References

External links

2021 albums
Albums produced by Jack Antonoff
Albums recorded in a home studio
Decca Records albums
Diana Ross albums